is a former Japanese baseball player who played in the Japanese professional leagues from 1969–1988, being remembered as one of the leading Japanese pitchers in the 1980s. He also was manager of the Seibu Lions from 1995 to 2001.

Professional career
Higashio was a star in the Koshien high school baseball tournament, helping his team advance to the semi-finals in the spring of 1968. He was drafted in the first round by the Nishitetsu Lions (the current Saitama Seibu Lions) later that year. He lost confidence in his pitching ability after seeing the high level of pitching in the Pacific League, and requested the team to convert him to a position player. The team accepted his request, but quickly withdrew it when the Black Mist Scandal erupted in the 1969 off-season. The ace of the Lions pitching staff, Masaaki Ikenaga, was banished from the professional leagues because of the scandal, and Higashio was forced into pitching a full year in the Lions starting rotation. His inexperience left him with a torrid 5.15 ERA in 40 games that year. Higashio made improvements in the following years, but still led the league in losses from 1971 to 1972. He pitched over 300 innings in 1972, but led the league in losses, hits given up, home runs given up, and runs given up. He also allowed over 100 walks in each of his seasons from 1971 to 1973.

The Lions team was sold by the Nishi-Nippon Railroad in 1973, becoming the Taiheiyo Club Lions, and was sold again to become the Crown Lighter Lions in 1978. It was during this turbulent period that Higashio emerged as the ace of the Lions pitching staff. He marked a 2.38 ERA in 1975, and led the league with 23 wins (but also in losses). He won 23 games again in 1978, pitching over 300 innings for the third time in his career. The Lions finally obtained financial stability in 1979, becoming the Seibu Lions, and won the Japan Series in 1982 and 1983. Higashio marked the lowest ERA in the league (2.92), and led the league in wins to receive the MVP award in 1983. The Lions won the Pacific League championship four years in a row from 1985–1988 (including three more Japan Series wins), and Higashio won his second MVP award in 1987. He announced his retirement in 1988.

Beanballs
Higashio often pitched towards the inside of the plate to intimidate opposing batters during his professional career, and he holds the Japanese career record for hit batsmen (165). He was not afraid to throw pitches close to the batter, and showed little remorse after hitting batters. In 1986, he received a beating on the mound by Kintetsu Buffaloes player Dick Davis, after hitting Davis with a pitch (Higashio continued pitching after the incident, marking the win).  Many fans sympathized with Davis, and demanded that Higashio be penalized as well for hitting so many batters. Managers of rival teams accused Higashio of purposely hitting batters, since Higashio possessed excellent control, and there was no way he could accidentally hit batters so often. Higashio has maintained that he never threw a pitch with the intention of hitting the batter.

Career statistics
Bolded figures are league-leading ones

Managerial career
Higashio worked as a sports commentator for various television networks before returning to the Lions in 1995 as manager. Higashio drafted several top players, and recruited Darrin Jackson and Orestes Destrade from the major leagues, but ended up in 3rd place in his first two seasons as manager. The emergence of several young players, including Kazuo Matsui, put the Lions over the top in Higashio's third year, and the team won consecutive league championships in 1997 and 1998 (the Lions lost the Japanese championship series both years). Pitchers Shinji Mori, Daisuke Matsuzaka, Fumiya Nishiguchi and Denney Tomori also emerged during Higashio's tenure as manager. The Lions placed in 2nd in 1999 and 2000, and fell to 3rd place in 2001, and Higashio resigned from his post at the end of 2001.

He has currently returned to his role as a sports commentator. In September, 2006, he became the head of the Tokyo Apache Japanese professional basketball team.

Higashio served as the pitching coach for the Japanese national baseball team in the 2013 World Baseball Classic.

Personal life
Higashio's daughter, Riko Higashio, is a professional golfer.

References

External links

Player profile

1950 births
Living people
Baseball people from Wakayama Prefecture
Japanese baseball players
Nishitetsu Lions players
Taiheiyo Club Lions players
Crown Lighter Lions players
Seibu Lions players
Nippon Professional Baseball MVP Award winners
Managers of baseball teams in Japan
Seibu Lions managers
Japanese Baseball Hall of Fame inductees